Tactical Tech (est. 2003) is an international nongovernmental organization that engages with citizens and civil-society organisations to explore and mitigate the impacts of technology on society. Since 2012, the organisation has been based in Berlin.

Their work has gone through a number of phases since the organisation was founded in 2003, but the core principle has remained constant: they examine how issues arise in different contexts, explore what responses are needed and find strategies and tactics to work with and around them in a sustainable way.

Their work can be most easily categorised by their two main audience groups:

The first is a much broader audience, grown from the increased public awareness and demand for public education around online privacy, security and wellbeing in a data-driven world. Through projects like The Glass Room and the Data Detox Kit, they find creative and accessible formats to demystify technology and give people actionable, sustainable changes to make in their own digital lives.

The second audience group is made up of civil society actors, such as journalists, other NGOs or human rights defenders, with whom they work to create safer, more robust and more informed practices with regard to their use of digital technologies. Projects such as Exposing the Invisible help empower people to use digital investigations to uncover truth or corruption. Similarly, their work on Data and Politics provides a unique contribution to understanding how the misuse of data is impacting negatively on democracies around the world.

Key projects

 NGO in-a-box (2003–2006)
Message in-a-box (2008)
Mobiles in-a-box (2009)
Ten Tactics (2009–2013)
Ono Robot series (2010)
Security in-a-box (2008–2019)
 Me and My Shadow (2011–2018)
 Visualising Information for Advocacy (2013–2018)
 Gender and Technology Institutes (2014–2018)
 Exposing the Invisible (2016–present)
 Holistic Security (2016–2019)
 The Glass Room (2016–present)
 Data Detox Kit (2016–present)
 XYZ (2017–2019)
 Data and Activism (2017–present)
 Data and You (2017–present)
 Data and Politics (2017–present)

Activities 

 Summer Source Camp, open source workshop, held in Croatia (2003)
 NGO in-a-Box (2003)
 NGO-in-a-Box, security edition
 NGO In A Box South Asia
 Africa Source, open source workshop, held in Namibia (2004), Uganda (2006)
 Asia Source, a series of three open source camps held in Bangalore, India (2005), in Sukabumi, Indonesia (2007) and in Silang in the Philippines (2009).
 '10 Tactics for Turning Information into Action', a 50-minute film (2009) that shows "how social justice organizations in the Global South use everything from Google Earth to Facebook in their campaigns."
 The White Room Berlin (2016)
 The Glass Room New York (2016) 
 The Glass Room London (2017)
 The Glass Room Community Edition (2017)
 The Glass Room San Francisco (2019)
 Exposing the Invisible: The Kit (2019)
 Youth Project (2020)

See also
 Open Knowledge Foundation

References

External links
 Official site

Communications and media organisations based in Germany
Information and communication technologies for development
Citizen media
International organisations based in Germany
Organizations established in 2003
Information technology education
Free and open-source software organizations